Argynnis ruslana is a species of butterfly in the family Nymphalidae. It is found in eastern China, Amurland, Korea, and Japan.

The larvae feed on Viola species.

Subspecies
There are two recognised subspecies:
Argynnis ruslana ruslana (Amur, Ussuri)
Argynnis ruslana lysippe (Japan)

Gallery 

Argynnis
Butterflies of Asia
Butterflies of Japan
Insects of Korea
Insects of Russia
Butterflies described in 1866
Taxa named by Victor Motschulsky